Manchester United F.C.–Arsenal F.C. brawl may refer to:
Manchester United F.C.–Arsenal F.C. brawl (1990)
Battle of Old Trafford, 2003
Battle of the Buffet, 2004